M. K. Muneer is an Indian politician, physician, social worker, singer, poet and author from Kerala. He was the Minister for Social Welfare and Panchayat in the last (May 2011 – May 2016) UDF Ministry, headed by Oommen Chandy and represented the Kozhikode South constituency in the legislative assembly. He was also the Minister for Public Works in A K Antony Ministry 3. Muneer is a State secretary of the Indian Union Muslim League and was the Chairman of the Malayalam TV channel Indiavision. He has written ghazals and books including Fascism and the Sangh Parivar. He is a qualified medical doctor and patron of MCC-THAS-Haemophilia Society.

Muneer is the only son amongst the three children of C. H. Mohammed Koya, veteran Muslim league politician and former Chief Minister of Kerala and Amina. In March 2017 he was elected as Deputy opposition leader in Kerala Legislative Assembly. He did his MBBS in a private medical college in Karnataka. With a special order by the Government of Kerala post his father's death, he was allowed a transfer to Government Medical College, Kozhikode and eventually completed his course from there.  This became a controversy after he questioned the state aid given to a leader from Nationalist Congress Party.

Minister in different ministries

Kerala Legislative Assembly election, 2021
In the 2021 Kerala Legislative Assembly election, he contested from Koduvally. He defeated Karat Razack by a margin of 6344	 votes.

Controversies
Muneer put a pro-LGBTQ post in Facebook during the pride month in 2021, only to be withdrawn later following severe criticism from party members. Once popular as the progressive face of IUML, Muneer later became a staunch supporter of patriarchal and conservative form of Islam. His weird argument that gender neutrality will make POCSO Act redundant stirred up a massive political controversy. More recently, he is known for delivering hate speeches against the LGBT+ community including a controversial article published in Suprabhatam daily where he accused homosexuals of being violent and demanding rights for child sex abuse.

References

External links 

Malayali politicians
Living people
Politicians from Kozhikode
20th-century Indian medical doctors
1962 births
Indian Union Muslim League politicians
Kerala MLAs 1991–1996
Kerala MLAs 2016–2021
Kerala MLAs 2011–2016
Medical doctors from Kerala